Goodnite may refer to:

 "Goodnite", a song by Melody Gardot from Worrisome Heart
 Goodnite (album), a 1998 album by Walt Mink

See also
Goodnight (disambiguation)